Sheely may refer to:

Earl Sheely (1893 - 1952), first baseman for the Chicago White Sox
Sheelytown (Omaha), ethnic Irish neighborhood in South Omaha, Nebraska

See also
Sheeley (disambiguation)